Pleomorphic T-cell lymphoma (also known as "Non-mycosis fungoides CD30− pleomorphic small/medium sized cutaneous T-cell lymphoma") is a cutaneous condition characterized by a 5-year survival rate of 62%.

See also 
 Cutaneous T-cell lymphoma
 Non-mycosis fungoides CD30− cutaneous large T-cell lymphoma
 Skin lesion

References 

Lymphoid-related cutaneous conditions